Eristena bifurcalis is a moth in the family Crambidae. It was described by Pryer in 1877. It is found in China and Taiwan.

References

Acentropinae
Moths described in 1877